Dynalite is a lighting and automation control system developed in Sydney, Australia by a company of the same name. In 2009 the company was bought by Philips to become Philips-Dynalite. The system is commonly used for lighting control, building automation, home automation and room automation applications and is sold worldwide.

System design
The Dynalite system consists of:

User Interfaces - Switches, panels, motion and heat sensors, touch screens and recently IOS devices,

Panels are typically standard sized (Australian or European standard size) wall switch plates, but instead of normal rocker switches, they have buttons of various designs, usually with an indicator LED inside.

Output devices - Dimmers, Relays, LED drivers and DALI, DSI and 0–10 volt controllers.

The dimmers range anywhere from a single 240 V relay controller to leading and trailing edge 1-20 amp dimmer devices.

Network Backbone Devices:
Network connectors extend the range of the network, as well as providing integration with other technologies such as AMX, Crestron, etc.

Through the 100-BT device, the communication network can be extended over TCP/IP networks, which also allows the use of computer systems which can integrate into the system.

Areas and channels

The network components are all used to set a system of Areas and Channels. Any given lighting, fan, louvre, and relay circuit is a Channel in an Area.

For example, a house might have 3 rooms. Each room is called an Area. The kitchen may contain overhead lights, a range-hood fan and lights over the bench. These three are called Channels.

Those Areas and Channels are in states called Presets. In Preset 1, typically, all lights etc. are fully on, in Preset 4, all of the lights are off. This is all customisable either by the programmer, or if it has been allowed, by the end user as well.

So, sending 'Area 3 Preset 4' will turn off the lights in Area 3 (room 3). Sending 'Area 3 Preset 2' will set the lights to a low level, which is customisable.

Channels can also be sent presets aside from the preset of the area to which they belong. 'Area 3 Preset 4' turns off the lights, then 'Area 3 Channel 7 Preset 1' will turn that light back on.

Communications
Dynalite components communicate using DyNet. The physical layer consists of a modified RS-485 TIA/EIA-485-A serial bus running along CAT5 cable, blue and blue/white carry the hot and cold signal respectively, orange and orange/white carry +12 V DC, green and green/white carry 0 V, Brown and Brown/white are unused. End of line termination is required 

DyNet 1 is the most commonly used protocol over the bus, being messages of 8 bytes of data, the 8th byte being a checksum. Data is sent at speed of 9600 baud, 8 bits, no parity, 1 stopbit (8N1). Commonly there are two types of message sent via DyNet 1: logical and physical. Logical messages talk to Areas and Channels, and physical messages talk directly to the devices. These 2 are typically called 1C and 5C messages, on account of the first byte of their message.

A 1C message consist of: [1C] [Area] [Data 1] [OpCode] [Data 2] [Data 3] [Join] [Checksum]

Area is the Logical Area the message is to control.

OpCode defines the Action to be taken on the Area.

Join is a bitswitch which can be used to filter out selected channels.

An OpCode of 00 to 03 means the action is to send the given area into preset 1 to 4 plus 8 times the value of Data 3 over the time specified by Data 1 and Data 2.

An OpCode of 0A to 0D means the action is to send the given area into preset 5 to 8 plus 8 times the value of Data 3 over the time specified by Data 1 and Data 2.

That gives a possibility of 8 × 255 presets. A usual job uses 4 to 8, and generally preset 4 is reserved to 'Off' or 'all to 0%'.

DyNet 2 is used mainly to upload data to devices on the network. It allows larger messages of data to be sent at higher speeds (115200 baud), significantly reducing lag time.

Advantages

Each device contains its own programmable logic controller and follows the peer-to-peer model, the main advantage of this is that there is no reliance on a single central controller, the system is capable of a high level of resilience and therefore well suited to situations where total failure could be a safety issue, such as lighting systems in public places.

The 'Message on Change' system only sends a message every time a lighting state is to change, as opposed to the DMX protocol, which is constantly streaming the entire data-map. This allows for much more devices on a single bus, but also leads to missed messages - as below.

As most of the DyNet is openly published, it is possible to integrate with third party devices.

Disadvantages

The DyNet protocol offers no error correction or transmission control, each network message is sent on a 'best effort' basis. This means that if a transmitted message is corrupted or missed by a receiving device, there is nothing to pick up that the message was not received, but also makes for much faster communication and response to user input in ideal situations.
The design opens the possibility of devices missing messages. In the case of a user pushing a button to turn on a light, this does not present a large problem as the user will probably notice and press the button again, but if it is an automated message say, from a timeclock, there is potential for an important message turning on outside lights of a shopping center to be missed. The usual workaround for this is to simply send the important message twice or more.

The previous Dynalite programming software (dLight 2) commonly in use up to 2011, (and still sometimes used for older equipment) was built progressively upon a Windows 3.11 application, and hides many undocumented keyboard shortcuts which are necessary to program a system.

The Envision editor was launched in 2010 and is designed to be more intuitive and easy to use. It is designed for programmers - it is not expected that end users will be able to set up their own systems, one needs training (usually free) provided by Dynalite distributors.

Implementations
A selection of large scale installations of DyNet in buildings:
Australian National Museum - Canberra (AU)
Australian National University - Canberra (AU)
BT Convention Centre - Liverpool (UK) convention centre
Burj Khalifa -  World's tallest building
Burswood Entertainment Complex - Perth WA
Crown Casino - Melbourne (AUS) Casino
Du HQ - Du Head office Dubai
Echo Arena Liverpool - Liverpool (UK) arena
Gold Coast Convention and Exhibition Centre - Gold Coast QLD
Google - Office in Bogota, Colombia
Grand Hyatt - Dubai hotel
Jin Mao Building - Previously China's tallest building
Manolas Residence - Perth WA
Te Papa - New Zealand museum
National Museum of Scotland - Edinburgh Scotland (UK) Museum
Perth Convention Exhibition Centre - Perth WA
Suncorp Stadium - Australian Olympic venue
The Roundhouse - London (UK) theatre
Titan Plaza - Mall in Bogota, Colombia
Trafford Centre - Manchester (UK) shopping mall
Westfield - London (UK) shopping mall

See also
Home automation
Intelligent building
Lighting control system
Smart Environments
Room automation
touch panel

References

Sources
 Dynalite's showcase page
 Dynalite's technical documentation page

External links
Dynalite's homepage

Manufacturing companies of Australia
Electronics companies of Australia
Lighting brands
Building automation
Home automation companies